The 1981–82 IHF Women's Cup Winners' Cup was the sixth edition of IHF's competition for European women's handball national cup champions. It was contested by 18 teams, two more than the previous edition, so a preliminary round was introduced.

RK Osijek defeated defending champion Budapesti Spartacus in the final to become the first team from Yugoslavia to win Cup Winners' Cup, starting a 5-year period of Yugoslav hegemony in the competition.

Results

Preliminary round

Final stages

References

Women's EHF Cup Winners' Cup
1981 in handball
1982 in handball